The visa policy of Singapore deals with the requirements to enter Singapore. A foreign national, depending on their country of origin, must meet certain requirements to obtain a visa, which is a permit to travel, to enter and remain in the country. A visa may also entitle the visa holder to other privileges, such as a right to work, study, etc. and may be subject to conditions.

Citizens of most countries and territories can enter Singapore without a visa. A citizen of one of the visa waiver eligible countries and territories can temporarily enter the country for a period of 30 or 90 days without a visa depending on their nationality. However, nationals of some countries must first obtain a visa in advance before being allowed to enter Singapore. Countries whose citizens require a visa to enter Singapore are categorized into countries eligible to apply for an electronic visa and countries whose citizens need a visa in advance.

In recent years, applications of visitor visas, work permits, study permits and certain types of permanent residency are submitted online. However, such applicants must provide their biometrics (photograph and fingerprints) as a part of their application process. Depending on the country by which the passport was issued, a visa application may have to be submitted at a visa application centre at a Singaporean diplomatic mission.

Entry requirements

All visitors to Singapore must:
 hold a passport or a travel document valid for more than 6 months at the time of departure,
 hold an onward or return ticket;
 have sufficient funds for the duration of stay in Singapore;
 have entry documents (including a visa if required) to their next destination (if applicable);
 have a visa and/or a yellow fever vaccination certificate for entry into Singapore (if applicable).

SG Arrival Card
Prior to entering Singapore, all travellers (including Singapore citizens) are required to submit an SG Arrival Card  online, which provides personal information, trip details and health declaration, to Singapore immigration. Singapore citizens are exempt from the requirement to submit an SG Arrival Card if entering Singapore by land.

The electronic SG Arrival Card must be submitted within three days prior to the date of arrival in Singapore, to avoid unnecessary delays during immigration clearance.

Travellers can submit their personal information and trip details via an official link or via the "SG Arrival Card" mobile application from either the App Store (iOS) or Google Play (Android).

The Electronic Arrival Card is free of charge. The Electronic Arrival Card is not a substitute for a visa.

The paper-based Disembarkation Card has been discontinued.

Visa policy map

Visa-free
Citizens of countries not in the Assessment Level I or Assessment Level II lists are allowed a maximum stay of either 30 or 90 days in Singapore without a visa, depending on nationality.

Conflicting visa-free access information
According to Timatic, nationals of  do not need a visa to enter Singapore for a maximum stay of 30 days. This, however, is not supported by the Immigration and Checkpoints Authority, which states that South Sudanese nationals must obtain a visa.

Visa required
Singapore categorises countries whose citizens require a visa to enter into two groups – Assessment Level I and Assessment Level II countries.

Assessment Level I Countries
Holders of normal passports or travel documents issued by the following countries and territories may obtain an e-visa from the Immigration and Checkpoints Authority (ICA)'s online portal through a local Singaporean contact or a strategic partner in Singapore; if successful, the applicant can enter Singapore with a printout of the e-visa. Applicants may alternatively obtain a visa at the nearest Singaporean diplomatic mission or from one of its authorized visa agents outside Singapore. e-Visa and regular visa applications lodged by nationals of Assessment Level I countries are processed in 1 working day, excluding the day the application was submitted. Visa requirement does not apply to holders of non-ordinary passports of these countries with the exception of North Korea.

 Holders of  Hong Kong Document of Identity for Visa Purposes
 Holders of  Macao Special Administrative Region Travel Permit

Assessment Level II Countries

Holders of all passports (except some non-ordinary passports mentioned below) or travel documents issued by the following countries and territories may obtain an e-visa from the Immigration and Checkpoints Authority (ICA)'s online portal through a local Singaporean contact or a strategic partner in Singapore; if successful, the applicant can enter Singapore with a printout of the e-visa. Applicants may alternatively obtain a visa at the nearest Singaporean diplomatic mission or from one of its authorized visa agents outside Singapore. e-Visa and regular visa applications lodged by nationals of Assessment Level II countries are processed in 3 working days, excluding the day the application was submitted.

 Holders of temporary passports issued by the 
 Holders of refugee travel documents issued by any Middle-East country
 Stateless persons (a holder of an alien's passport, such as certificate of identity and refugee travel document, is considered as stateless by ICA, regardless of the nationality appearing on the holder's travel document)

Non-ordinary passports
Of the non-ordinary passport holders of Assessment Level II countries, visa requirement does not apply to holders of diplomatic or official/service passports of Bangladesh, Jordan, Tunisia and of diplomatic passports of Saudi Arabia and Morocco.

Automated Clearance Initiative (ACI) 
In May 2022, ICA announced that from the second half of this year, foreign travellers who have enrolled their facial and iris biometrics on their initial visit to Singapore will be able to use automated immigration clearance on subsequent trips to Singapore. Known as the Automated Clearance Initiative (ACI), no separate registration is required; travellers will be notified on their eligibility to use the automated lanes at the passenger halls and motorcycle lanes on departure and subsequent trips to Singapore upon successful enrolment at the immigration counters. Travellers are required to provide a valid email address within their SG Arrival card submissions in order to receive their Electronic Visit Pass (e-Pass) when using the automated lanes; travellers will not be issued an arrival immigration endorsement in their passports. 

In February 2022, ICA also announced that from 2023, all travellers will be able to use automated lanes upon arrival in Singapore for faster immigration clearance; the ICA noted that "the use of iris patterns and facial features as primary identifiers for immigration clearance not only provides more robust and reliable identity authentication of travellers, but (also) more hygienic, convenient and efficient immigration clearance".

As of February 2023, the Automated Clearance Initiative (ACI) is available for enrolment, for the following nationals (aged 6 and over):

a - Persons who possess either a Chinese passport or Indian passport must also hold a Multiple Journey Visa (MJV) valid for 5 years or longer, to be eligible for enrolment into the ACI.

b - For British passport holders, only British citizens are eligible for enrolment into the ACI.

Frequent Traveller Programme (FTP) 
The Frequent Traveller Programme allows eligible travellers to enjoy convenient immigration clearance via automated clearance facilities – also known as the enhanced-Immigration Automated Clearance System – at some Singapore Checkpoints.

To enroll in the programme, the traveller must have visited Singapore at least 2 times previously within the last 24 months. Enrolling into the programme is free of charge.

Holders (aged 6 and above) possessing passports issued by the following countries can enroll into the Frequent Traveller Programme:

a - Only British citizens are eligible for enrolment.

APEC Business Travel Card (ABTC)

Holders of passports issued by the following countries who also possess an APEC Business Travel Card (ABTC) containing the "SGP" code on the reverse, which indicates that it is valid for travel to Singapore, can enter Singapore without a visa for business trips for up to 60 days, unless otherwise stated. They are also eligible for enrollment into the Frequent Traveller Programme.

ABTCs are issued to nationals of:

Visa-free transit
Nationals of Assessment Level I and II countries do not require a visa to transit through Singapore Changi Airport as long as they fulfill the following requirements:
 have an onward ticket,
 remain in the transit area,
 have their luggage checked to their final destination,
 do not clear immigration to enter Singapore, and,
 are not travelling on a low-cost airline (except for passengers travelling on Scoot with Scoot-thru, or Jetstar with connecting flights purchased on the same booking).

Nationals of certain Assessment Level I countries may also enter Singapore under the Visa Free Transit Facility.

Visa-Free Transit Facility (VFTF)

Nationals of India or China
Schengen visas are also accepted if the visa allows entry into Germany or Switzerland.

Single-journey visas issued by these eight countries are also acceptable for transit, but if using the VFTF on the return journey (i.e. after the single journey visa has been used) the traveller must travel directly from the visa-issuing country and directly back to the home country, and the traveller must have not returned to their home country since the single journey visa was last used.

They may enter Singapore by any mode of transport but must depart by air or sea. They must have a valid onward air/ferry/cruise ticket departing Singapore within 96 hours.

Nationals of the Commonwealth of Independent States, Georgia, Turkmenistan and Ukraine
Nationals of the following countries may enter Singapore without a visa for 96 hours if they are in transit to or from any third country. These nationals may use the VFTF on both the forward and the return journey. They may enter Singapore by any mode of transport but must depart by air.

Mandatory yellow fever vaccination
All travellers, including Singapore residents, who arrive in Singapore from countries with risk of yellow fever transmission (listed below) require an International Certificate of Vaccination in order to enter Singapore. Failure to provide a valid yellow fever vaccination certificate, would result in the traveller being quarantined under Section 31 of the Infectious Disease Act, for a maximum of six days upon arrival in Singapore. Non-residents who object to the quarantine, will be denied entry and returned to his/her place of origin or last port of embarkation. The vaccination requirement is imposed by this country for protection against Yellow Fever since the principal mosquito vector Aedes aegypti is present in its territory.

Admission restrictions

History
Due to the COVID-19 pandemic, all short-term visitors were not allowed to enter or transit through Singapore effective 23 March 2020, 2359 hours.

From 29 March 2020, 2359 hours, all Singapore long-term pass holders, as well as those granted in-principle approval for long-term passes, were required to obtain an entry approval from the relevant government agency (Immigration and Checkpoints Authority, Ministry of Education or Ministry of Manpower) before commencing their journey to Singapore. All travellers will need to submit a health and travel declaration online prior to arrival, and will be issued a 14-day stay home notice upon arrival.

Statistics
Most visitors arriving to Singapore on short-term basis were from the following countries of nationality:

See also

 Visa requirements for Singaporean citizens

References

External links
 Immigration & Checkpoints Authority
 List of Singapore Embassies, Ministry of Foreign Affairs of Singapore 

Singapore
Foreign relations of Singapore